2022 Cambodian Premier League is the 36th season of the Cambodian Premier League, the top Cambodian professional league for association football clubs, since its establishment in 1982.

Eight teams will be competing in a triple round-robin match. 5 teams that are National Police Commissary, Asia Euro United, Electricite du Cambodge, Prey Veng, and Soltilo Angkor are relegated to the Cambodian League 2 because they did not fulfill the Cambodian Football League Company's requirements. The season began on March 5, 2022.

Phnom Penh Crown were the defending champions and successfully defended their title, winning their 2nd consecutive title and 8th title overall.

Teams

Personnel and kits

Foreign players

The number of foreign players is restricted to 5 per team. A team can use 4 foreign players on the field in each game, including at least 1 player from the AFC region.

Players name in bold indicates the player is registered during the mid-season transfer window.

Players holding Cambodian dual citizenship
Cambodian dual nationals do not take up foreign players quota.

Regular season

League table

Results

The second-round date will be announced after all first-round matches are played.

Some matches will be updated

Championship round

League table

Results

Season statistics

Top scorers
As of 04 December 2022.

Top assists
As of 28 August 2022.

Hat-Tricks
As of 28 August 2022.

Notes
(H) – Home team(A) – Away team
4 player scored 4 goals
5 player scored 5 goals

Clean sheets
As of 04 December 2022.

Controversies
After Angkor Tiger supporters threw bottles at the referee in protest of his choice not to award a penalty to their teams against Preah Khan Reach Svay Rieng on Matchday 13, they were prohibited from competing at their home stadium. The decision was overturned, however, as Angkor Tiger was permitted to play in their home stadium but spectators were prohibited from attending and the clubs were required to pay a fine.

Awards

See also
2022 Cambodian League 2
2022 Hun Sen Cup

References

C-League seasons
Cambodia
1
Association football controversies
Controversies in Cambodia